The Portal of the Folded Wings Shrine to Aviation is in Los Angeles, California. The shrine is a  structure of marble, mosaic, and sculpted figures and is the burial site for fifteen pioneers of aviation. Designed by Kenneth A. MacDonald Jr. and sculptor, Federico Augustino Giorgi, it was built in 1924 as the entrance to Pierce Brothers Valhalla Memorial Park Cemetery. Aviation enthusiast James Gillette was impressed by the rotunda's close proximity to the airport and Lockheed Aircraft Company. He conceived a plan to use the structure as a shrine to aviation and worked to that end for two decades. It was dedicated in 1953 by aviation enthusiasts who wanted a final resting place for pilots, mechanics, and other pioneers of flight.

Dedicated to the honored dead of American aviation on the 50th anniversary of powered flight, December 17, 1953, by Lieutenant General Ira C. Eaker USAF (retired). Beneath the memorial tablets in this sacred portal rest the cremated remains of famous flyers who contributed so much to the history and development of aviation. The bronze plaques upon the marble walls memorialize beloved Americans who devoted their lives to the advancement of the air age. Administered under the auspices of the Brookins–Lahm–Wright Aeronautical Foundation, this shrine stands as a lasting tribute.

On May 27, 1996, it was rededicated by Dr. Tom Crouch, Chairman of the Aeronautics Department at the National Air and Space Museum of the Smithsonian Institution.

Burials
 Bertrand Blanchard Acosta (1895–1954), co-pilot with Admiral Richard Byrd in 1927
 Jimmie Angel (1899–1956), discoverer of Angel Falls – his ashes were later removed and scattered over the falls.
 Walter Richard Brookins (1889–1953), flew for the Wright brothers
 Mark Mitchell Campbell (1897–1963), stunt pilot and aircraft designer
 John Franklin Bruce Carruthers (1889–1960), Chaplain of the Portal of the Folded Wings and air historian. His epitaph reads: "At the grave, when my warfare is ended. Though no flowers emblazon the sod. May a prayer mark the good I intended. Leaving all decoration to God."
 Warren Samuel Eaton (1891–1966), Colonel and early pilot who built airplanes for Lincoln Beachy
 Winfield Bertrum Kinner (1882–1957), a.k.a. Bert Kinner, built "Kinner" airplanes. Amelia Earhart flew a Kinner.
 Augustus Roy Knabenshue (1876–1960), balloon and dirigible pilot who flew in the Dominguez Air Meet in 1910 and manager of the Wright brothers exhibition team, the "Wright Fliers."
 John Bevins Moisant (1868–1910), won the Statue of Liberty Race in 1910; first to carry a passenger across the English Channel.
 Matilde Moisant (1878–1964), the second licensed female pilot in the United States in 1911
 Elizabeth Lippincott McQueen (1878–1958), one of Los Angeles's first female pilots
 James Floyd Smith (1884–1956), test pilot and instructor for Glenn Martin and manufacturer of parachutes. He built and flew his own plane in 1912 and invented the free-type manually operated parachute for the Army in 1918.
 Hilder Florentina Smith (1890–1977), aerial acrobat and parachute jumper. She was married to James Floyd Smith.
 Carl Browne Squier (1893–1967),  World War I aviator, barnstormer, test pilot, and salesman. As Vice President of Lockheed Aircraft he sold Charles and Anne Lindbergh their Sirius airplane in 1931.
 Charles Edward Taylor (1868–1956), machinist for the Wright brothers who helped design and build the first engine for the Wright Flyer flown at Kitty Hawk

The Burbank Aviation Museum, inside the shrine, is open on the first Sunday of each month from 1 to 3 p.m.

References

External links
 The Portal of the Folded Wings Shrine to Aviation
 
 

Cemeteries in Los Angeles
Buildings and structures in the San Fernando Valley
Monuments and memorials in Los Angeles
North Hollywood, Los Angeles
History of aviation
History of the San Fernando Valley
Buildings and structures completed in 1924
Buildings and structures on the National Register of Historic Places in Los Angeles
Cemeteries on the National Register of Historic Places in California
Monuments and memorials on the National Register of Historic Places in California
National Register of Historic Places in the San Fernando Valley
Science and technology in Greater Los Angeles
1924 establishments in California
20th century in Los Angeles
1920s architecture in the United States
Arches and vaults
Spanish Colonial Revival architecture in California